Where No One Stands Alone may refer to:
"Where No One Stands Alone", a song on 1967 Elvis Presley album How Great Thou Art
Where No One Stands Alone (album), 2018 Elvis Presley compilation album